Gulfport station is a closed Amtrak intercity train station in Gulfport, Mississippi, United States. Gulfport is a former union station that served the Louisville and Nashville Railroad and Gulf and Ship Island Railroad (which was succeeded by the Illinois Central Railroad).

Former Louisville & Nashville services which utilized their station included the Gulf Wind (New Orleans–Jacksonville), Pan-American (New Orleans–Cincinnati) and Humming Bird (New Orleans–Cincinnati), as well as an additional unnamed day train (New Orleans–Jacksonville). The Louisville & Nashville also operated the southern leg of the Crescent and Piedmont Limited through the station under contract to the Southern Railway).

Amtrak service began with the Gulf Coast Limited, which operated between 1984 and 1985 and called at the station. The stop was reactivated on March 31, 1993 in service on the Sunset Limited.

In 1986, the depot was designated a Mississippi Landmark by the Mississippi Department of Archives and History. The building serves as the Gulfport Centennial Museum. It is also a contributing property of the Gulfport Harbor Square Commercial Historic District. Train service has been suspended since Hurricane Katrina struck Gulfport in 2005.

In anticipation of a new service between New Orleans and Mobile, Amtrak installed new station signs in 2023.

References

External links

Gulfport Amtrak Station (USA Rail Guide — Train Web)

Former Amtrak stations in Mississippi
Buildings and structures in Gulfport, Mississippi
Former Louisville and Nashville Railroad stations
Gulfport
Railway stations closed in 1971
Railway stations in the United States opened in 1984
Railway stations closed in 1985
Railway stations in the United States opened in 1993
Railway stations closed in 2005
Former Illinois Central Railroad stations